Sir John Grice (6 October 1850 – 27 February 1935) was an Australian businessman, company director and University of Melbourne vice-chancellor.

Biography
Grice was born in Selly Oak, fourth son of Richard Grice, a Selly Oak merchant. He was educated at Aston University 1861–66 and the just-opened Wesley College, Melbourne (where he was the first boy to matriculate and qualify for the University of Melbourne). Grice graduated LL.B. in 1871, and BA in 1872. Grice founded the University Boat Club, rowed for his university and was also a member of the Victorian four-oared crew in 1872. Grice was called to the bar in 1872 but never practised.

Grice instead entered the family firm of Grice, Sumner and Company and eventually became one of the leading business men of Melbourne. Grice was a 45-year board-member of the National Bank of Australasia, and for 26 of these years was chairman of directors. Grice was also for many years chairman of directors of the Metropolitan Gas Company, of the Trustees Executors and Agency Company, and the Dunlop Rubber Company. His ability, sound business sense, and absolute probity made him an important influence in the commercial life of Melbourne. He was also a good citizen in other ways. He was first elected to the committee of the Melbourne hospital in 1886, and was president from 1905 to 1918. He became a member of the Melbourne University Council in 1888, gave valuable service on the finance committee during a difficult period for the University, and was its vice-chancellor from 1918 to 1923.  Grice's portrait, by John Longstaff hangs in the architecture department.

During World War I Grice did valuable work as the first honorary treasurer of the Victorian branch of the Australian Red Cross Society. He died at Melbourne on 27 February 1935. Grice married Mary Anne (died 1931), daughter of David Power, in 1878. He was survived by two sons. One of his sons was killed in the Second Boer War in 1901 and another in France in 1916. Grice was knighted in 1917.

References

1850 births
1935 deaths
Australian businesspeople
People educated at Wesley College (Victoria)
Melbourne Law School alumni
Vice-Chancellors of the University of Melbourne